Pascale Bussières (born June 27, 1968) is a French Canadian actress.

Life and work 
Born in Montreal, Quebec, Canada, Pascale Bussières first attracted attention as a suicidal teenager in Micheline Lanctôt’s 1984 film Sonatine; however, it was Blanche, the 1993 Radio-Canada series directed by Charles Binamé that gave her star status in Quebec. After Blanche, and then a lead in Binamé’s Generation-X picture Eldorado, Bussières became the 1990s heir to Geneviève Bujold and Carole Laure – the most charismatic actress of her generation. It's a measure of Bussières's range as an actress that her follow-up to Eldorado was the role of a prim-and-proper mythology teacher who discovers her lesbian desires in Patricia Rozema's When Night Is Falling. She also gives a standout performance as an alienated fashion model who wants to conceive a child in Denis Villeneuve's debut feature, August 32nd on Earth (Un 32 août sur terre), and won both the 2004 Best Actress Prix Jutra and Genie Award for her dramatic impersonation of Quebec singing star Alys Robi in Bittersweet Memories (Ma vie en cinémascope).

Filmography

Film

Television

See also 
List of Quebec actors
Cinema of Quebec
Culture of Quebec

References

External links 
 

1968 births
Living people
Canadian film actresses
Canadian television actresses
Concordia University alumni
French Quebecers
Best Actress Genie and Canadian Screen Award winners
Actresses from Montreal
20th-century Canadian actresses
21st-century Canadian actresses
Best Actress Jutra and Iris Award winners
Best Supporting Actress Jutra and Iris Award winners